John Murgatroyd Hubbard (born 1839, died 29th Oct 1899 ref**) was a convict transported to Western Australia, and later became one of the colony's ex-convict school teachers.

Born in 1839, Hubbard was working as a clerk in 1863 when he was convicted of forgery and sentenced to twenty years' penal servitude. He was transported to Western Australia on board the Racehorse, arriving in August 1865. After receiving his ticket of leave, he worked for Daniel Connor for a while, then briefly taught at Wicklow school. In 1873 he was appointed school master at Newcastle (now Toodyay). During this time he also employed other ticket-of-leave convicts to dig out sandalwood stumps from land that had been previously cut over.

In March 1875, Hubbard married Amelia Cockburn, the daughter of an early settlers.  That he married outside the "bond" class was highly unusual for the time. He then resigned his teaching post and moved to Guildford where he worked as an accountant. From 1879 until 1884 he was secretary at the Boys' Orphanage, and for a short time he also taught there. In 1888 he was appointed clerk to the Guildford Municipal Council.

Hubbard died in hospital from the effects of poison, a Coronial Inquiry held on the 7th November 1899 by Acting District Coroner Dr E Black, found the cause of death was asphyxia caused by strychnine that was administered by the deceased.

References
 

Western Australi Police Gazette No 46 Wednesday, November 15, 1899

1839 births
Convicts transported to Western Australia
Australian schoolteachers
Year of death missing